Khristoforos Karolou (born 1901, date of death unknown) was a Greek sailor. He competed in the Star event at the 1948 Summer Olympics.

References

External links
 

1901 births
Year of death missing
Greek male sailors (sport)
Olympic sailors of Greece
Sailors at the 1948 Summer Olympics – Star
Sailors (sport) from Athens